John Farnum may refer to:
 John Farnum (cricketer), Guyanese cricketer
 John Egbert Farnum, United States Army general